Silvio Marzolini (4 October 1940 – 17 July 2020) was an Argentine football player who gained recognition during his tenure on Boca Juniors (1960–72). He is widely regarded as the best Argentine left back of all time, playing that position for the Argentina national football team in the 1962 FIFA World Cup and the 1966 FIFA World Cup, where he was elected as the best left back of that tournament. Marzolini played a total of 28 games for Argentina.

Biography 
Marzolini's first steps as footballer were in Deportivo Italiano, soon moving to the young divisions of Ferro Carril Oeste in 1955. After a discussion with the club managers asking to play in the Senior team, Marzolini was suspended for two years. Nevertheless, he debuted in Primera División in May 1959, playing against Boca Juniors, that would hire him the following year.

Marzolini debuted with Boca on April 3, 1960 against Estudiantes de La Plata, defeating it by 2-1. Boca finished 3rd. at the end of the season, with Marzolini playing all of the games.

In 1961 Marzolini scored his first goal in the top division, but Boca did not have a great campaign, finishing 5th. Marzolini played a total of 29 games scoring 2 goals. The first achievement came in 1962 when Boca won the title, with notable players such as goalkeeper Antonio Roma, Brazilian striker Paulo Valentim and Norberto Menéndez. Boca finished 1st with 42 points. Marzolini was also the most capped player of the season with 28 games played.

After retiring as a player, Marzolini became manager of All Boys where he stayed from 1975 to 1976. In 1981 Marzolini returned to Boca Juniors, with which he won the 1981 Metropolitano with superstar Diego Maradona as the outstanding player of the team. Other notable players for Boca were Miguel Brindisi, goalkeeper Hugo Gatti and defender Oscar Ruggeri.

In a 2007 interview with FourFourTwo magazine, English great Bobby Charlton named him in his dream eleven, describing him as a player who "wasn’t that fast, but his positioning was so good he didn’t need to be", and that he had "such good control that it gave him time and space to play the ball away safely".

Marzolini suffered a stroke in 2019 and was later diagnosed with cancer. He died on July 17, 2020, at the age of 79.

Honours

Player

Boca Juniors
 Primera División (5): 1962, 1964, 1965, 1969 Nacional, 1970 Nacional
 Copa Argentina (1): 1969

Argentina
 Panamerican Championship (1): 1960

Manager

Club
Boca Juniors
 Primera División (1): 1981 Metropolitano

References

External links

 
 
 Marzolini biography on AFA website
 Informe Xenieze biography
 Interview by BBC Mundo

1940 births
2020 deaths
Argentine footballers
Argentine Primera División players
Boca Juniors footballers
Ferro Carril Oeste footballers
Footballers from Buenos Aires
Argentine people of Italian descent
1962 FIFA World Cup players
1966 FIFA World Cup players
Argentina international footballers
Argentine football managers
All Boys managers
Boca Juniors managers
1967 South American Championship players
Association football defenders
Deaths from cancer in Argentina